Flat Brook, also spelled as Flatbrook, is an  tributary of the Delaware River in Sussex County, New Jersey in the United States.

Upstream of the inflow of Little Flat Brook, the brook is known as Big Flat Brook.

Historically, the watershed of the Flat Brook, and its two main tributaries, the  Little Flat Brook and  Big Flat Brook, has been known as the Walpack Valley and is part of the historic Minisink region.

The Appalachian Trail passes through the watershed of the Flat Brook along Kittatinny Mountain.

The Flat Brook flows into the Delaware River near Walpack Bend in the Flatbrookville section of Walpack Township.

Tributaries
 Flat Brook
 Tillman Brook
 Little Flat Brook
 Beerskill
 Big Flat Brook
 Criss Brook
 Forked Brook
 Normanock Brook
 Parker Brook
 Stony Brook

See also
List of rivers of New Jersey

References

External links
Delaware Water Gap National Recreation Area (National Park Service)
Stokes State Forest
U.S. Geological Survey: NJ stream gaging stations

Rivers of New Jersey
Rivers of Sussex County, New Jersey
Tributaries of the Delaware River